The Timbavati River is a river in Mpumalanga Province of South Africa. It flows mostly through the Kruger National Park after entering the Park adjacent to Maroela Caravan Camp  near Orpen Rest Camp.

See also

 List of rivers in South Africa
 Timbavati Game Reserve

References 

Rivers of Mpumalanga